Events from the year 1802 in Scotland.

Incumbents

Law officers 
 Lord Advocate – Charles Hope
 Solicitor General for Scotland – Robert Blair

Judiciary 
 Lord President of the Court of Session – Lord Succoth
 Lord Justice General – The Duke of Montrose
 Lord Justice Clerk – Lord Eskgrove

Events 
 January – Mitchell's Hospital Old Aberdeen admits its first residents.
 2 October – first Start Point lighthouse on Sanday, Orkney, completed by Robert Stevenson.
 10 October – the reforming quarterly The Edinburgh Review is first published by Archibald Constable.
 November – the Royal Philosophical Society of Glasgow is established as the Glasgow Philosophical Society "for the improvement of the Arts and Sciences".
 The planned village of Lybster is established by the local landowner, General Patrick Sinclair.
 The University of Glasgow Medico-Chirurgical Society is established as a student society.
 John Playfair publishes Illustrations of the Huttonian Theory of the Earth in Edinburgh, popularising James Hutton's theory of geology.
 John Home publishes History of the Rebellion of 1745.
 Malcolm Laing publishes History of Scotland from the Union of the Crowns to the Union of the Kingdoms.

Births 
 1 April – William Sharpey, anatomist and physiologist (died 1880 in London)
 20 May – David Octavius Hill, painter and pioneer photographer (died 1870)
 10 July – Robert Chambers, publisher, geologist and writer (died 1871)
 16 July – Humphrey Crum-Ewing, Liberal politician (died 1887)
 20 August – Robert Ferguson, Liberal politician (died 1868)
 24 August (bapt.) – John Macgregor, shipbuilder (died 1858)
 28 August – Thomas Aird, poet (died 1876)
 19 September – Henry Dundas Trotter, admiral (died 1859 in London)
 10 October – Hugh Miller, geologist (suicide 1856)
 Thomas Boyd, banker in New South Wales (died 1860 in Australia)

Deaths 
 21 January – John Moore, physician and writer (born 1729; died in London)
 26 February – Alexander Geddes, Roman Catholic theologian and scholar (born 1737; died in London)
 John Mackay, botanist (born 1772)
 Donald MacNicol, clergyman and writer (born 1735)

The arts
 29 January – Greenock Burns Club holds the first Burns dinner, in Alloway.
 Walter Scott's collection of Scottish ballads Minstrelsy of the Scottish Border begins publication by James Ballantyne in Kelso.

See also 
 1802 in the United Kingdom

References 

 
Scotland
Years of the 19th century in Scotland
1800s in Scotland